Ristella rurkii, commonly known as Rurk's ristella, is a species of skink endemic to the Western Ghats of southern India. It is a small, insectivorous, diurnal skink found in shola grasslands and rainforests of hills ranges in parts of Tamil Nadu and Kerala states of India.

Etymology
The specific name, rurkii, is in honor of "Dr. Rurk" who collected the type specimen.

Geographic range
R. rurkii is found in South India, in the Anaimalai Hills, High Ranges, Travancore, and the Palni Hills, of Tamil Nadu and Kerala. It is endemic to rainforests south of Palghat Gap.

References

Further reading
Beddome RH (1870). "Descriptions of some new lizards from the Madras Presidency". Madras Monthly J. Med. Sci. 1: 30-35. (Ateuchosaurus travancoricus, new species, p. 33).
Boulenger GA (1887). Catalogue of the Lizards in the British Museum (Natural History). Second Edition. Volume III. ... Scincidæ ... London: Trustees of the British Museum (Natural History). (Taylor and Francis, printers). xii + 575 pp. + Plates I-XL. (Ristella rurkii, pp. 357–358 + Plate XXIX, figures 1, 1a).
Boulenger GA (1890). The Fauna of British India, Including Ceylon and Burma. Reptilia and Batrachia. London: Secretary of State for India in Council. (Taylor and Francis, printers). xviii + 541 pp. (Ristella rurkii, pp. 215–216, Figure 57).
Gray JE (1839). "Catalogue of the Slender-tongued Saurians, with Descriptions of many new Genera and Species". Ann. Mag. Nat. Hist. [First Series] 2: 331-337. (Ristella rurkii, new species, p. 333).
Smith MA (1935). The Fauna of British India, Including Ceylon and Burma. Reptilia and Amphibia. Vol. II.—Sauria. London: Secretary of State for India in Council. (Taylor and Francis, printers). xiii + 440 pp. + Plate I + 2 maps. ("Ristella rurki [sic]", p. 331).
Stoliczka F (1871). "Notes on new or little-known Indian Lizards". Proc. Asiatic Soc. Bengal (Calcutta) 1871: 192-195. (Ristella malabarica, new species, p. 195).
 Ganesh, S.R. (2018). The rediscovery of Rurk’s Cat Skink Ristella rurkii Gray, 1839 (Reptilia: Ristellidae) with remarks on distribution and natural history. Journal of Threatened Taxa, 10(10), 12376-12381. https://doi.org/10.11609/jott.3946.10.10.12376-12381

Ristella
Taxa named by John Edward Gray
Reptiles described in 1839